Qendër Libohovë is a former municipality in the Gjirokastër County, southern Albania. At the 2015 local government reform it became a subdivision of the municipality Libohovë.

The population at the 2011 census was 1,264.

The municipal unit consists of the villages Labovë e Sipërme, Labovë e Poshtme (together also referred to as Labovë e Kryqit), Suhë, Stegopull, Drino and Nepravishtë. An important cultural, religious and historical monument in the municipality  St. Mary's Church, Labovë e Kryqit.The church seen today is essentially a creation of the 13th century at the time of the Despots of Epirus. However,  an original foundation may go back to AD 527-565  during the reign of Emperor Justinian.

Notable people 
Behxhet Nepravishta

References

Former municipalities in Gjirokastër County
Administrative units of Libohovë